The 2022 World Mixed Doubles Curling Championship was held from April 23 to 30 at the Curling Club Trois-Chêne in the Geneva Sous-Moulin Sports Center in Thônex, a suburb of Geneva, Switzerland. The event was held alongside the 2022 World Senior Curling Championships. Eve Muirhead and Bobby Lammie of Scotland went undefeated the entire event, beating home team Alina Pätz and Sven Michel of Switzerland 9-7 in the final to win the gold medal.

Medallists

Qualification
The following nations qualified to participate in the 2022 World Mixed Doubles Curling Championship:

Russian participation
As part of international sports' reaction to the Russian invasion of Ukraine, on February 28 the World Curling Federation initiated proceedings to remove the Russian Curling Federation from the 2022 Curling Championship, pending until March 3. In its statement the WCF said:
 On March 4, 2022, the WCF announced the removal of the RCF from the 2022 World Curling Championships. Their vacated spot was offered to Spain, who accepted.

Chinese withdrawal
Due to ongoing travel restrictions related to the COVID-19 pandemic, China decided to withdraw from the tournament. Their spot was replaced by Denmark.

World ranking
The World Curling Federation World Ranking tracks and lists the success of all Member Associations.

Teams
The teams are as follows:

Round robin standings
Final Round Robin Standings

Round robin results

All draw times are listed in Central European Summer Time (UTC+02:00).

Draw 1
Saturday, April 23, 10:00 am

Draw 2
Saturday, April 23, 2:00 pm

Draw 3
Saturday, April 23, 6:00 pm

Draw 4
Sunday, April 24, 10:00 am

Draw 5
Sunday, April 24, 2:00 pm

Draw 6
Sunday, April 24, 6:00 pm

Draw 7
Monday, April 25, 10:00 am

Draw 8
Monday, April 25, 2:00 pm

Draw 9
Monday, April 25, 6:00 pm

Draw 10
Tuesday, April 26, 10:00 am

Draw 11
Tuesday, April 26, 2:00 pm

Draw 12
Tuesday, April 26, 6:00 pm

Draw 13
Wednesday, April 27, 10:00 am

Draw 14
Wednesday, April 27, 2:00 pm

Draw 15
Wednesday, April 27, 6:00 pm

Draw 16
Thursday, April 28, 10:00 am

Draw 17
Thursday, April 28, 2:00 pm

Draw 18
Thursday, April 28, 6:00 pm

Relegation playoff
Friday, April 29, 9:00 am

Playoffs

Qualification Game 1
Friday, April 29, 9:00 am

Qualification Game 2
Friday, April 29, 12:30 pm

Semifinal 1
Friday, April 29, 4:00 pm

Semifinal 2
Friday, April 29, 7:30 pm

Bronze medal match
Saturday, April 30, 10:00 am

Final
Saturday, April 30, 2:00 pm

Statistics

Top 5 player percentages
Final Round Robin Percentages

Top 5 playoff player percentages
Final playoff percentages

Final standings

References

External links

World Mixed Doubles Curling Championship
World Mixed Doubles Curling Championship
World Mixed Doubles Curling
World Mixed Doubles Curling Championship
Sports competitions in Geneva
International curling competitions hosted by Switzerland
21st century in Geneva